Natalia María Málaga Dibos (born 26 January 1964) is a volleyball player and coach from Peru. She participated in four Summer Olympics with the Peru women's national volleyball team. She placed sixth in 1980, fourth in 1984, won a silver medal at the 1988 Seoul Summer Olympics, and placed 11th in 2000. She was a member of the Peruvian team that won second place in the World Championship in 1982, and the third place in the World Championship in 1986.

Career
Málaga won the 1995 South American Club Championship gold medal playing with the Peruvian club Juventus Sipesa.

Clubs
  Alianza Lima (1994)
  Juventus Sipesa (1995)

In popular media 
Málaga had a minor role in the film La paisana Jacinta en búsqueda de Wasaberto.

References

External links
 
 

1964 births
Living people
Olympic volleyball players of Peru
Volleyball players at the 1980 Summer Olympics
Volleyball players at the 1984 Summer Olympics
Volleyball players at the 1988 Summer Olympics
Volleyball players at the 2000 Summer Olympics
Olympic silver medalists for Peru
Peruvian women's volleyball players
Olympic medalists in volleyball
Medalists at the 1988 Summer Olympics
Volleyball players at the 1983 Pan American Games
Volleyball players at the 1987 Pan American Games
Pan American Games silver medalists for Peru
Pan American Games bronze medalists for Peru
Pan American Games medalists in volleyball
Medalists at the 1983 Pan American Games
Medalists at the 1987 Pan American Games
Medalists at the 1991 Pan American Games
20th-century Peruvian women